Castleforward Demesne is a townland just east of Newtowncunningham, a village in The Laggan, a district in the east of County Donegal in Ireland. The townland is near the south-eastern shores of Lough Swilly and is in the Barony of Raphoe North.

References

Townlands of County Donegal